Benjamin Rasgo Madrigal Jr. (born September 28, 1963) is a retired Philippine Army general serving as the Administrator of the Philippine Coconut Authority under the Duterte administration since January 2020. He previously served as the Chief of Staff of the Armed Forces of the Philippines from December 2018 to September 2019. He is a graduate of the Philippine Military Academy "Sandiwa" Class of 1985, along with his predecessor Gen. Carlito Galvez Jr.

On January 28, 2020, President Rodrigo Duterte appointed Madrigal as a member of the governing board of the Philippine Coconut Authority.

Education and Background
 Benjamin Madrigal is a product of the University of the Philippines Rural High School and the University of the Philippines Los Baños. He graduated in 1980 before entering the Philippine Military Academy in 1981.
 
He is a member of the Philippine Military Academy "Sandiwa" Class of 1985, and also attended various courses locally and abroad, such as the Infantry Officer Advance Course, and Special Security and Intelligence Course, in the AFP Command and General Staff College, ranking 1st in his class; the Forward Observer Course in Manly, Australia; and the Military and Peacekeeping Operations in Accordance with the Rule of Law in Newport, Rhode Island. He holds a master's degree in management studies at the University of New South Wales in Australia, and earned his Master of Public Administration in the Philippine Christian University.

He was also a member of the  Board of Directors, Philippine Army Provident Fund (2010-2013),  Philippine Army Officers’ Club Council (2010-2013),  Philippine Army Golf Club Council (2010-2013), AFP Financial Institutions Accreditation Board (2010-2013), PMA Alumni Association, Inc. (PMAAAI) Mother Board (2009-2011), became the President of the Philippine-Australian Defense Scholars’ Association, Inc, (2012-2013), Vice President of the PMAAAI – Philippine Army Chapter (2011-2013), and the Manager of the Philippine Army Officers’ Club (2008-2009), as well as the President of the PMAAAI Eagle Fraternal Chapter (Davao) (2014-2018).

Military career
After graduating in 1985, he spent most of his career deployed in Mindanao, and led various units in both the Philippine Army and the AFP, such as the 26th Infantry Battalion of the 4th Infantry Division, and the 701st Infantry Brigade of the 10th Infantry Division.

He is known to be focused, highly regarded, deliberate, and having "steep standards". He also served as the head executive assistant to the chief of staff, became Philippine Army Chief of Staff, became the head of the Army Chief Management Fiscal Office, and deputy chief of staff for plans, J5; responsible for overall war planning operations.

He also led 2 infantry divisions: the 10th Infantry Division, where he served as both commander and assistant commander; and the 4th Infantry Division. He also served as the commander of the AFP Southern Luzon Command, and the AFP Eastern Mindanao Command, before being appointed as the Chief of Staff of the Armed Forces of the Philippines on December 12, 2018, succeeding his classmate, General Carlito Galvez Jr. He earned his fourth star and was promoted to the rank of General on January 10, 2019. He retired from military service on September 24, 2019, after serving more than 9 months in his post, where he was replaced by his classmate, General Noel Clement.

Awards

Right Side:

Badges and Other Awards:
  Legion of Merit (US Armed Forces)
  Combat Commander's Badge (Philippines)
  Scout Ranger Qualification Badge
  Special Forces Qualification Badge
  Naval Aviator's Badge 
  Philippine Army Command and General Staff Course Badge
  PAF Gold Wings Badge
 PMA Outstanding Achievement Award 
 Kapit Bisig Trophy for AFP's PEACE recognition from the Metrobank Foundation

Personal life
Known by his peers as "Benjie", Madrigal was born and raised in the resort town of Bayan, Los Baños, Laguna. He is married to Gemma "Gie" Convenido-Madrigal and they have four children.

References

1963 births
Living people
Philippine Army generals
Chairmen of the Joint Chiefs (Philippines)
Duterte administration personnel
Philippine Military Academy alumni
People from Los Baños, Laguna
Recipients of the Philippine Republic Presidential Unit Citation
Recipients of the Distinguished Service Star
Recipients of the Outstanding Achievement Medal
Recipients of the Philippine Legion of Honor
Recipients of the Military Civic Action Medal
Recipients of the Gold Cross (Philippines)
Recipients of the Military Merit Medal (Philippines)
Recipients of the Military Commendation Medal
Recipients of the Silver Wing Medal
Recipients of Gawad sa Kaunlaran
Philippine Christian University alumni
University of New South Wales alumni